The 2008 United States Senate election in Oklahoma was held on November 4, 2008. The statewide primary election was held July 29, with the run-off on August 26. Incumbent Republican U.S. Senator Jim Inhofe won re-election to a third term over Democrat Andrew Rice.

This was the last time a Democrat carried any counties in an Oklahoma U.S. Senate election until 2022 and the last time any Democrat did so in a regular Senate election.

Democratic primary

Background 
Rice officially filed as a candidate for the United States Senate from Oklahoma on Monday, June 2, 2008. He won the Democratic primary against Jim Rogers, a retired schoolteacher who stressed campaign finance reform. As in earlier campaigns, Rogers refused to accept money to avoid any question of his allegiances. State Senator Kenneth Corn had earlier expressed interest in the race.

Candidates 
 Andrew Rice, State Senator
 Jim Rogers

Results

Republican primary

Candidates 
 Jim Inhofe, incumbent U.S. Senator
 Dennis Lopez
 Evelyn Rogers
 Ted Ryals

Results

General election

Candidates 
 Jim Inhofe (R), incumbent U.S. Senator
 Andrew Rice (D), State Senator
 Stephen Wallace (I), businessman

Campaign 
Inhofe, who in August 2008 had a 61% approval rating, emphasized his conservative record and tried to label Rice as a  "committed liberal." In the debates, Rice tried to connect Inhofe to George W. Bush saying "An era allowed this to happen. George Bush came into office eight years ago with a Republican majority and … an agenda of radical deregulation." Rice also believed in global warming, something Inhofe is famous for denying. In the election, Inhofe had over $5 million in the bank. Rice had $3.8 million.

Predictions

Polling

Results

See also 
 2008 United States Senate elections

References

External links 
 U.S. Congress candidates for Oklahoma at Project Vote Smart
 Oklahoma, U.S. Senate from CQ Politics
 Oklahoma U.S. Senate from OurCampaigns.com
 Oklahoma U.S. Senate race from 2008 Race Tracker
 Campaign contributions from OpenSecrets
 Inhofe (R-i) vs Rice (D) graph of multiple polls from Pollster.com
 Official campaign websites (Archived)
 James Inhofe, (R)
 Andrew Rice (D)

2008
Oklahoma
United States Senate